The following article lists various football clubs in 
Germany.

List of clubs

See also
List of football clubs in Germany by major honours won
Founding Clubs of the DFB
German football champions
List of football clubs in East Germany

References